A Cell Phone Movie is a 2011 Bosnian documentary film directed by Nedžad Begović. The film was shot entirely on his mobile phone and won the Best Documentary Award at the 2011 Sarajevo Film Festival and the Jury Award for Best Documentary Film at 2012 Bosnian-Herzegovinian Film Festival in New York.

References

External links
 

2011 films
2011 documentary films
Bosnia and Herzegovina documentary films
Bosnian-language films
Mobile phone films